Michael Ciaran Parker (born 4 May 1952), known by his stage name Michael Barrymore, is an English actor, comedian and television presenter of game shows and light entertainment programmes on British television in the 1980s, 1990s and 2000s. These included Strike It Lucky, My Kind of People, My Kind of Music, Kids Say the Funniest Things, and his own variety show, Barrymore. In 1993, he headlined the Royal Variety Performance.

At his peak, Barrymore was voted the UK's favourite television star several times, and became one of the highest-paid stars on television from the mid-1980s to the late-1990s. After his peak of popularity in the mid-1990s, Barrymore appeared on Celebrity Big Brother and other shows including The Friday Night Project, Graham Norton's Bigger Picture, This Morning, The Sharon Osbourne Show and The Saturday Night Show. He starred in Bob Martin from 2000 to 2001, a comedy drama in which he played the title role of a failing television game-show host.

Barrymore's television career effectively ended after the death of Stuart Lubbock in 2001 following a party at Barrymore's house in Essex. Barrymore was the subject of police investigations and legal action around the case over several years.

Early life
Born Michael Ciaran Parker in Bermondsey, he lived on the Dickens estate for the first 18 years of his life with his two elder siblings. His father left when Barrymore was 11 and they never saw each other again. Barrymore and his siblings were raised in the Roman Catholic faith of their Irish mother, Margaret.

Career

Early career
Barrymore spent his early career working as a Redcoat at Butlins holiday camps and then in the West End theatre shows of London, where he met dancer and lifelong friend Cheryl St Claire in 1974. They married in 1976. With Cheryl as manager and the mastermind behind Barrymore's rise to fame, he first won a 1975 edition of New Faces, became a regular panellist on Blankety Blank and then the warm-up man for Larry Grayson on the Generation Game and also for Little and Large theatre shows. In the early days, Barrymore used to do impressions of John Cleese and Norman Wisdom, among others.

Television career (1976–2002)
Barrymore rose to fame via appearances on Blankety Blank and Who Do You Do? and his television career began firstly by having his own sketch show entitled The Michael Barrymore Show in 1983, which starred a young Nicholas Lyndhurst, and he also appeared in Russ Abbott's Madhouse as various characters between 1981 and 1982. He walked out of his contract with LWT, who produced The Michael Barrymore Show, after only one series; he then landed the presenter's role on the BBC gameshow, Get Set Go!. He appeared in a number of Royal Variety Performance shows, his first being in 1983. He became the host of ITV gameshow Strike It Lucky (which later became Strike It Rich) in 1986 and it grew in popularity over the years and this was watched by 18 million viewers at its peak.

This was Barrymore's first successful presenting role (Get Set Go! had been cancelled after only one single series), which led then to his own light entertainment show, Barrymore in 1991. However, before that he had his own show between 1988 and 1989, produced for the BBC entitled Michael Barrymore's Saturday Night Out; it was set in Jersey and the theme tune, "Doin' the Crab" had been released as a single in 1987.

In 1991, Barrymore was given his own show entitled Barrymore where he interviewed guests, performed his comedy routines and joined in with other performers on the show. The show lasted throughout the 1990s right up to 2000, and was consistently nominated for awards over the years in the UK. Among the many famous guests that appeared on Barrymore were Cliff Richard, Uri Geller, and Spike Milligan.

Following his appearance on the 1993 Royal Variety Performance, where he performed a version of "Will You Still Love Me Tomorrow" with soldiers, he became popular on television and on the stage. The Royal Variety Show performance brought the house down and cemented Barrymore's place at the heart of the British public. Barrymore became well known through his catchphrases of "Awight!", on making his entrance, and on Strike It Lucky, "Top, middle or bottom?" and  "What is a hot spot not?", to which the studio audience would reply "Not a good spot". 
Following on from the success, Barrymore had a very public battle with substance abuse. He went into rehab due to his alcohol and drug addiction in 1994. He left after a couple of months and went on to write a best-selling book about his experiences, including rehab, and he also went on a stage tour called Back in Business in 1994.

He then regained his former status and made another series of Barrymore and recorded a new series called My Kind of People. He came out as gay on 19 August 1995 and split from his wife in 1996. He made a new series of Strike It Lucky, now called Strike It Rich and another Barrymore series. More editions of Strike It Rich and Barrymore were shown in 1997 and he also appeared in Spice World as Mr. Step.

A spin-off talent show, My Kind of People and game show My Kind of Music followed the success of both Barrymore and Strike It Rich. Following a dip in ratings, Barrymore was cancelled in 1997 (it later returned in 2000). He went on to new projects with Kids Say the Funniest Things, Animals Do the Funniest Things and Barrymore on Broadway. He was voted the UK's favourite TV star several times, and became one of the highest-paid stars on TV. Barrymore won the National Television Award for Most Popular Entertainment Presenter five out of the first six years, last at the 6th NTAs in 2000. This makes him the last winner of that award before Ant and Dec, who since the 7th NTAs in 2001 have been named Most Popular Entertainment Presenter (or, since 2016, Most Popular TV Presenter) every year the awards were held, 19 in all as of January 2020.

He recorded two new series called My Kind of Music and Kids Say the Funniest Things in 1998 along with more Strike It Rich. Newer editions of all three series were shown and another series of Barrymore was recorded and shown in 2000. The year 2000 also saw Barrymore move into acting in Bob Martin where he played the character of Bob Martin; he recorded two series of the comedy (2000–01). Barrymore also presented a second series of Kids Say the Funniest Things which aired in late 2000 and also a fourth series of My Kind of Music which was on the air at the time that Stuart Lubbock died in Barrymore's pool on 31 March 2001. Following Lubbock's death, both Bob Martin and My Kind of Music stayed on the air but whilst the investigation was ongoing, he did not record any further programmes for ITV. They constantly backed him when asked by the newspapers and simply waited for investigations to conclude. In October 2001, Barrymore was given a drugs caution and began recording a new series of My Kind of Music.

Death of Stuart Lubbock

Party
Following a party at Barrymore's house in Essex in the early hours of 31 March 2001, a 31-year-old man, Stuart Lubbock, was discovered unconscious in Barrymore's swimming pool. Three witnesses – including Barrymore – claimed to have found him motionless in the pool. Witnesses disagreed on whether Lubbock was found floating on top of the pool or at the bottom. Barrymore had said he was on top of the pool. Lubbock, described as a "bubbly partygoer", had traces of drugs and alcohol in his system. In the postmortem, pathologists discovered severe anal injuries, which several experts, including senior Home Office pathologist Nathaniel Cary, later agreed were consistent with a sexual assault.

Many tabloid newspapers accused Barrymore of holding drug-fuelled gay orgies in his home and asserted he had some responsibility for the death. Kylie Merritt, a partygoer, had claimed that Barrymore had been seen at the party rubbing cocaine onto Lubbock's gums, an allegation Barrymore denied.

Arrest and inquest
Barrymore received a police caution for possession and use of cannabis. Barrymore and two other people at the party, unemployed Justin Merritt and drag queen Jonathan Kenney, were arrested on suspicion of murder on 6 June 2001. No other charges were laid against him or anyone else in connection with the death. The inquest that took place in September 2002 reached an open verdict. In light of the verdict, Cheryl Barrymore was approached by a friend of the Lubbock family. She provided the family's solicitor with both an affidavit and subsequent court testimony that her ex-husband had lied under oath, and could in fact swim; she also alleged he had rubbed cocaine onto the gums of other people as well as his own.

In November 2002, Barrymore's lawyers successfully demanded that Essex Police re-investigate matters surrounding Lubbock's death. Their focus was on Barrymore's allegations that the injuries inflicted upon Lubbock's body could have occurred while it was lying unguarded in the mortuary. A pathologist's report found that Lubbock's wounds were only four hours old at the time of the examination at 4 pm, while Lubbock had been pronounced dead at the Princess Alexandra Hospital in Harlow at 8.20 am that morning. Barrymore told Five Live: "We want to prove the fact that the anal injuries could not have happened at the house." He added: "If these injuries had happened then, why have the police not charged anyone with anything?" An investigation into these claims by Essex Police in 2003 found "no evidence" to support them, instead concluding there was "strong evidence" the injuries were sustained before the arrival of paramedics.

Private prosecution
On Barrymore's high-profile return to the UK in January 2006 to take part in Celebrity Big Brother, former solicitor, politician and local activist Anthony Bennett initiated a private prosecution, comprising six charges regarding Barrymore's alleged misuse of drugs on the night of Stuart Lubbock's death. The action commenced in Epping Magistrates' Court in January 2006 and, on 10 February 2006, a District Judge at Southend Magistrates' Court blocked the private prosecution against Barrymore on the grounds of insufficient evidence being available for the case to continue. Bennett was no longer a solicitor and was acting independently of Terry Lubbock, Stuart's father.

Reopened investigation
In an interview with Piers Morgan in the December 2006 edition of GQ, Barrymore stated there were other witnesses to the events who were hiding information. On 2 December 2006, police announced they were re-opening the investigation into Lubbock's death. The re-investigation followed a lengthy dossier submitted by Bennett, who was now Terry Lubbock's solicitor, cataloguing a series of alleged failures by Essex Police in the original investigation and claiming that there had been an elaborate cover-up of the true circumstances of Lubbock's death.

Complaints processes
On 22 December 2006, following a successful complaint to the Press Complaints Commission by Bennett, The Sun published a letter from Terry Lubbock replying to the newspaper's five-page feature on Barrymore earlier in the year which featured Terry's meeting with Barrymore.

On 1 March 2007, the Independent Police Complaints Commission (IPCC), following a complaint lodged the previous December by Terry Lubbock, announced an investigation into aspects of the police inquiry into Lubbock's death after receiving complaints from the Lubbock family. It was reported that complaints surrounded information Essex Police gave to a coroner and pathologist after Lubbock's death. In May the IPCC agreed with Terry Lubbock a schedule of 36 separate complaints relating to the original investigation into Lubbock's death.

Further arrests
On 14 June 2007, Essex Police arrested Barrymore and two other men on suspicion of murder and sexual assault in the Lubbock case. The two other men arrested were Jonathan Kenney, Barrymore's partner at the time of the death, and Justin Merritt, an unemployed former dustman at the time, all present at the party when Lubbock died. The three men were held for questioning at South Woodham Ferrers police station.

This followed reports in The Harlow Herald that police had seized tapes from the home of Barrymore's literary agent, Tony Cowell, allegedly containing conversations between Cowell and Barrymore.

On 15 June 2007, police were given permission to question Barrymore and one other man for a further 12 hours. Barrymore's solicitor Henri Brandman confirmed his client was one of the men arrested. Later that day Barrymore was released on police bail pending further enquiries. His solicitor stated that Barrymore "categorically denied" the allegations made and had not been charged with any offence.

Investigation dropped
On 31 July 2007, it was announced that Barrymore had been re-bailed to appear at an Essex Police station on 10 September. He answered bail on 10 September at a police station in Harlow, Essex. Police were then granted a further 12 hours to question him. On that date, Barrymore and the other two men were told that they would not face charges for the events that occurred. The case was left open. In July 2008 Lubbock's father published the book Not Awight: Getting Away With Murder, co-authored with Bennett, explaining their theory that Stuart had died as a result of a violent attack on him, which Barrymore and his associates that night covered up.

Civil action
In July 2015, Barrymore began the process of suing Essex Police over his arrest. In October 2016, it was reported that High Court papers showed police had admitted that Barrymore was wrongfully arrested and detained. This was because "the arresting officer, PC Cootes, was not fully aware of the grounds for arrest ... and not by reason of a lack of reasonable grounds to suspect the claimant."

Hugh Tomlinson QC, for Mr Barrymore, had told the High Court judge that Mr Barrymore was never charged with any offence and the Crown Prosecution Service (CPS) later made it “crystal clear” that there was no basis for any charges.

On 18 August 2017, the High Court in London ruled that Barrymore would be entitled to "more than nominal" damages against Essex Police after being wrongly arrested 10 years previously. The judge did not decide on the sum to be awarded, as his ruling dealt only with the preliminary issue of the level of damages to be awarded. Barrymore was not present for the decision but valued his claim at more than £2.4 million. Essex Police released a statement on 1 July 2019 to announce that the claim for damages had been dropped, and that no payment had been made to Barrymore, following an appeal; the Court of Appeals judges determined instead that Barrymore was entitled only to ‘nominal’ damages.

Renewed appeal
On 4 February 2020 Essex Police offered a £20,000 reward for information leading to a conviction. The cash reward, funded by Essex Police and the charity Crimestoppers, was in response to a new Channel 4 documentary on the incident, Barrymore: The Body in the Pool, that aired on 6 February 2020.

On 17 March 2021, Essex Police confirmed that they had arrested a 50-year-old man from Cheshire in connection with the indecent assault and murder of Stuart Lubbock, as a result of the appeal. He was later released without charge.

Career revivals
Following the revelation of Lubbock's death, ITV terminated Barrymore's contract and his television career collapsed. A new series of Kids Say the Funniest Things recorded prior to the scandal was pulled from the ITV schedule and never broadcast. The Guardian reported that the BBC cancelled publication of Barrymore's life story. In September 2003, Barrymore staged a one-man show at London's Wyndham's Theatre, which closed after a few days. He subsequently immigrated to New Zealand to live with his partner, Shaun Davis. He has since had live stage shows in New Zealand and Australia. In 2005, he appeared in Chicago in Napier, New Zealand.

Celebrity Big Brother 
In December 2005, it was announced that Barrymore was being paid £150,000 by Channel 4 to take part in Celebrity Big Brother commencing 5 January 2006. He had a difficult relationship with housemate George Galloway, which culminated in a 20-minute heated argument between the two men. On 27 January 2006 he finished runner-up to Chantelle Houghton.

After Celebrity Big Brother 
Remaining in the UK, Barrymore was booked to be the guest host on Channel 4's The Friday Night Project for the edition broadcast on 3 February 2006. This is the last time that Barrymore appeared on a show as the presenter. The months following Barrymore's appearance on Big Brother were full of speculation that Barrymore was in talks with a number of television channels over the possibility of new shows, but nothing ever came of this. Barrymore's appearance on the Friday Night Project is the last time he presented a primetime television show.

It was announced that for Christmas 2006, Barrymore would play the title role in Bill Kenwright's production of Scrooge – The Musical. He performed the lead role at the Empire Theatre, Sunderland, but the production's scheduled transfer to the West End was cancelled. In January 2008, Barrymore took the role of comedian and writer Spike Milligan in the stage play Surviving Spike. It played Windsor and later the Edinburgh Fringe, but again, its West End transfer was cancelled. In February 2010, he appeared on Irish television on The Saturday Night Show, where he unexpectedly performed numerous bizarre and controversial antics, including pretending to be Jedward's father. In May 2010, Barrymore startled his co-contestants on a reality TV show by revealing that he had fallen in love with a woman. Barrymore was filming an episode of Channel 4 show Come Dine with Me, with former Generation Game host Anthea Redfern and presenters Pat Sharp and Jenny Powell, when he said he was going to have a party to celebrate that he was "coming back in".

His personal publicity, particularly in the tabloid press, continues to be negative. In December 2011, he was convicted of cocaine possession and fined £780. Although Strike It Rich and Strike It Lucky have been repeated on the digital channel Challenge, his entertainment shows such as Barrymore and My Kind of People are never repeated anywhere and his work is never included on clip shows, such as those marking ITV's 50th anniversary or the 100th anniversary of the London Palladium.

His only work in 2012 was on local radio stations, and on hospital radio. One was on Minster FM, on Greg Scott's breakfast show on 25 February 2012, where he was surprised to meet one of his all-time favourite television guests, Fiona Iverson, who had appeared on his show twenty years earlier.

In 2013, Barrymore appeared on RTÉ show The Saturday Night Show for the second time, his first appearance was in February 2010, on this show he talked about his harsh treatment by the press, his addiction and also the possibility of a new show called My Kind of Twits. He subsequently claimed on Twitter that a pilot for My Kind of Twits would be filmed in May, but this did not happen. Barrymore also appeared on The Nolan Show in June 2013.

In March 2019 Michael appeared on Piers Morgan Life Stories which generated a warm welcome and praise for the TV star.

In September 2019, it was announced that Barrymore would take part in the twelfth series of ITV's Dancing on Ice starting in January 2020. However on 18 December 2019, he had to withdraw because of a broken hand and was replaced by former Blue Peter presenter Radzi Chinyanganya.

Personal life
Barrymore met his former wife Cheryl Cocklin in 1974 while she was performing as a dancer in a West End theatre show. They married in 1976.

Cocklin became his manager and was the mastermind behind Barrymore's rise to fame. Cocklin later said that Barrymore had problems with alcohol and depression, and as a result of his attack on her at the Hotel Bel-Air in Los Angeles, she was placed by British police on the "at risk" register.

At the height of his popularity, Barrymore suffered increasing alcohol problems. Barrymore claims he wanted to seek help, but that Cheryl continually told him: "No, you're not (alcoholic). Don't be stupid."

Sexuality
In mid-1995, at the height of his fame, he went to The White Swan gay pub in London's East End, where he gave an impromptu stage performance to the largely local crowd singing the words: "Start spreading the news – I'm gay today". Within 48 hours, every tabloid newspaper had printed its own version of the evening's events, including an untrue claim that Barrymore had thrown away his wedding ring.

In November 1995, Barrymore attended the National Television Awards. At an after-show party on a live late night radio show, he publicly declared he was gay and "no longer wanted to live a lie", following which he split with Cheryl. She later claimed that Barrymore took the step and did not tell her because of his talks with Diana, Princess of Wales.

Divorce
After several aborted reunions, Cheryl and Michael divorced in 1997; she went on to publish the autobiography Catch a Falling Star in 2002, which contained details of their acrimonious split. The couple subsequently had no contact, and Cheryl at her request ceased to be Barrymore's agent or manager. Barrymore later suggested in his 2006 autobiography Awight Now: Setting the Record Straight that Cheryl was a control freak who controlled his every movement including his clothes, and she had created the character that was "Michael Barrymore", which consequently drove him to alcohol, drugs and gay affairs. In an interview in 2002, Barrymore stated he had an alcohol addiction and was in recovery.

On 1 April 2005, Cheryl died of lung cancer, aged 55, at the Hospital of St John and St Elizabeth in St John's Wood.

Filmography

Stand-up videos

References

Further reading
 The New Zealand Herald Barrymore not to blame for son's death, said father Barrymore not to blame for son's death, says father – Life & Style – NZ Herald News

External links
 
 
 

 
1952 births
20th-century English male actors
21st-century English male actors
20th-century English comedians
21st-century English comedians
BBC people
Bisexual male actors
Butlins Redcoats
Comedians from London
English game show hosts
English male comedians
English male television actors
English people convicted of drug offences
English people of Irish descent
ITV people
British LGBT broadcasters
Bisexual comedians
English LGBT actors
Living people
People from Bermondsey
British LGBT comedians